After Henry is a British sitcom that aired on ITV from 1988 to 1992. It was based on the radio series of the same name that was broadcast on BBC Radio 4 between 1985 and 1989. Like the radio series, the TV series was written by Simon Brett, and starred Prunella Scales and Joan Sanderson. It was made for the ITV network by Thames Television. The opening and closing music is "Three-Quarter Blues", by George Gershwin.

The BBC was reluctant to produce After Henry for television, so in 1988 after the third radio series Thames Television did so. The show was surprisingly popular, attracting over 14 million viewers. A second television series was shown during the same months as the fourth radio series with, in many cases, both radio and television episodes being broadcast on the same nights. The fourth television series was broadcast from July 1992, after the death of Joan Sanderson, who had died on 24 May.

Cast
 Prunella Scales – Sarah France
 Joan Sanderson – Eleanor Prescott
 Janine Wood – Clare France
 Jonathan Newth – Russell Bryant
 Fanny Rowe – Vera Polling (Series 1) 
 Peggy Ann Wood – Vera Polling (Series 2–4)
Anne Priestley – Mary (Series 2)
 Edward de Souza – Sam Greenland (Series 2 and 3)

Plot
Sarah France is the 42-year-old widow of a GP, Henry. She lives in an often volatile family situation with her elderly mother, Eleanor Prescott, and her daughter, eighteen-year-old Clare France, with both of whom she shares a house. After Henry's death, all three members of the family have to find a way to cope with each other as best they can.

Sarah often finds herself in the middle of things, usually figuratively, but always literally, given that she has her daughter living upstairs and her mother in the basement flat. (In the radio series, it was the mother who lived upstairs and the daughter downstairs.) Eleanor is ruthlessly cunning and takes every opportunity to get one over on Sarah. Anything told to Eleanor will spread by word of mouth throughout an extensive network of the elderly of the area, or the "geriatric mafia" or "geriatric KGB". Clare is trying to be independent of her mother, though often has to come running back in times of crisis.

The relationships between the three women change constantly through each episode. Sometimes mother and daughter ally against grandmother, sometimes mother and grandmother go against daughter, but usually grandmother and granddaughter gang up on the long-suffering Sarah, whose one haven is Bygone Books, the remarkably unsuccessful second-hand bookshop where she works for Russell, who dispenses in turn sympathy and wisdom. Most of the time, Russell sees the women's relationships second-hand through Sarah, although he isn't opposed to taking the occasional more active role when necessary. In turn, Sarah can see some of Russell's difficulties of living with a gay partner in a small 1980s Home Counties town while at the same time seeing Russell's relationship as the one perfect marriage she knows.

Production
The adaptation for television allowed more to be seen of some of the more minor characters in the radio series, with appearances by some who had appeared only by reputation on the radio. These included Eleanor's best friend and rival Vera Polling, and Valerie Brown on the pension counter's sister Mary.  In the television adaptation, Sarah also gained an on-off partner in Sam Greenland.

Many of the exterior locations for the television series were shot in the village of Thames Ditton in Surrey and Twickenham.

Episodes
Source:

DVD releases
All four series including a 6-disc set of the complete series have been released on DVD in the UK (Region 2).

Stage version
Encouraged by the success of the transfer from radio to television, in 1991 Simon Brett began writing a stage play version, with intention of both Scales and Sanderson continuing to play their roles, and the option of different actresses to portray Clare.  The production was planned as a three hander comedy-of-errors across the generation gaps, but the idea was dropped following the death of Sanderson in 1992, with Brett feeling that the part could not be replicated by anyone else.

Other versions
A Dutch version of the series, Zonder Ernst (translating as "without Ernst"), was made by NCRV.

References

 Mark Lewisohn, "Radio Times Guide to TV Comedy", BBC Worldwide Ltd, 2003

External links

1988 British television series debuts
1992 British television series endings
1980s British sitcoms
1990s British sitcoms
1980s British LGBT-related television series
1990s British LGBT-related television series
English-language television shows
ITV sitcoms
Television series by Fremantle (company)
Television shows set in Surrey
Television shows produced by Thames Television
Television shows shot at Teddington Studios
Television series about widowhood
Gay-related television shows
Television series based on radio series